Tony Spiridakis (born 1959 in Queens, New York) is an American film director, writer, actor, producer and playwright best known for such films as Queens Logic, Tinseltown, The Last Word, If Lucy Fell and Ash Tuesday. He is the writer of Inappropriate Behavior, which he produced with director Tony Goldwyn, William Horberg, and Jon Kilik. The film, which stars Bobby Cannavale, Robert DeNiro, Rose Byrne, and Vera Farmiga, follows a struggling comedian and his autistic son on a cross-country road trip.

Spiridakis has developed scripts for Dustin Hoffman, Richard Dreyfus, and Diane Keaton as well as for iconic producers such as Laura Ziskin, Stacey Snider, Mary Parent, and Warren Littlefield. Other films include Tinseltown, based on his acclaimed play Self Storage, both starring Ron Perlman and Joe Pantoliano; Noise, which he directed and produced, starring Ally Sheedy and John Slattery; the documentary road trip film Driving to Ground Zero; and If Lucy Fell, starring Sarah Jessica Parker and Ben Stiller. Spiridakis’ play The Last Word had a successful run in Los Angeles before he adapted, produced, and directed the film starring Timothy Hutton. His post-9/11 drama, Beyond The Ashes, co-starred Spiridakis with Giancarlo Esposito, Janeane Garofalo, and Tony Goldwyn.

Spiridakis’ TV credits include co-creating and producing the Fox series The Heights with Academy Award-winning screenwriter Eric Roth, the CBS crime drama Falcone with Academy Award-winning screenwriter Robert Moresco, and the Netflix legal drama Justice with Emmy-winning writer William Finkelstein. Spiridakis studied at the Yale School of Drama and has appeared in dozens of TV and films, including House, L.A. Law, The Equalizer, Bay City Blues, and Death Wish 3. Additionally, he produced and acted in Academy and Tony Award-winning writer Doug Wright’s play Callbacks and worked with Stanley Kubrick on the film Full Metal Jacket.

Currently, Spiridakis’ projects in pre-production include: Breath of Life, a true story about the mayor of an Italian village during WWII who makes the ultimate sacrifice to help the Allies drive the Nazis from Rome, which Spiridakis is set to direct; and Mike's Place, the true story of a blues bar in Tel Aviv during the Second Intifada that survives the devastation of a suicide bombing, with director Todd Komarnicki, who co-produces with Antoine Fuqua and Andrew Levitas.

In 2012 Spiridakis co-founded the Manhattan Film Institute, an intensive workshop where twenty-five directors and twenty-five actors write, shoot, and edit twenty-five original short films with mentorship from world-renowned writers, actors, producers, and directors.

Spiridakis is a father of two and a strong advocate for autism awareness.

Partial filmography

Film

Television

References

External links

American male screenwriters
American male film actors
Film producers from New York (state)
Living people
1959 births
People from Queens, New York
Film directors from New York City
Screenwriters from New York (state)